Founded in 1891, Lowell General Hospital is an independent, not-for-profit community hospital serving the Greater Lowell area and surrounding communities. With two primary campuses located in Lowell, Massachusetts, Lowell General Hospital offers a full range of medical and surgical services for patients. Lowell General Hospital is a member of the Voluntary Hospitals of America. Lowell General is affiliated with Tufts Children's Hospital in Boston.

History

The Lowell Free Hospital Association was founded in May 1891. James Fellows funded the purchase of the Fay mansion in the Pawtucketville neighborhood with a $30,000 donation, and in July 1893, Lowell General Hospital opened. In the first year, the Lowell General Hospital Training School for Nurses started.

LGH Nurses responded to the Spanish Influenza outbreak, which struck Lowell particularly hard, in November 1918. The epidemic killed several hundred people in the city.

In the twentieth century, the hospital underwent several expansions, with a building dedicated to the Nursing School, and a Maternity and Children's Building.

In 2012, Lowell General merged with Saints Medical Center, adding a second campus to the hospital, and consolidating hospital care in the city under the Lowell General Hospital name. The hospital, now one of the largest institutions in the Merrimack Valley, has 407 beds. Saints Medical Center itself has a long history in Lowell, itself formed by the 1992 merger of St. Joseph's Hospital and St. John's Hospital. St. Joseph's Hospital, the oldest in the city, had been founded as Lowell Corporation Hospital in 1839.

Magnet designation
The Magnet Recognition Program recognizes healthcare organizations that are dedicated to nursing excellence, professionalism and patient focused care. The American Nurses Credentialing Center (ANCC), the largest and most prominent nursing credentialing organization in the United States, honored Lowell General Hospital with Magnet Recognition for excellence in nursing care in October 2010. Lowell General was the eighth hospital in Massachusetts to achieve Magnet designation.

Criticism
The hospital has received criticism for the salary paid to its president, Joseph White, being 1.25 million, while hospital staff have not received increases in their compensation. According to ProPublica, in 2019 there were 12 employees being paid more than $200,000 per year: 

Joseph White (President): $1,324,761 
Amy Hoey (Chief Operating Officer): $759,458 
William Galvin III (Board Member/Medical Director):$523,540 
Cecelia Lynch (CNO): $409,111 
Arthur Lauretano (CMO): $400,926 
William Wyman (VP of finance): $366,595 
Wendy Mitchell (Medical Director): $312,213 
Ramya Prabhakar (Physician): $272,947 
James Woolman (Director ACO Performance Management): $261,532 
Emily Young (Director of Healthcare Operations): $261,055 
Yishis Ren (Chief Medical Physicist): $252,271 
Michelle Davis (VP External Affairs): $233,198

References

External links
 Lowell General

Hospital buildings completed in 1891
Hospitals in Middlesex County, Massachusetts
Buildings and structures in Lowell, Massachusetts
Voluntary hospitals
Trauma centers